Kesar Filippovich Ordin (1835—1892) was a 19th-century Russian mathematician and historian.

He was a graduate in mathematics of St. Petersburg University and author of a number of articles on Finland, opposing Finnish separatism.

Ordin is perhaps most known of his work in which he tried to disprove the claims published by Finnish (also part of Russia at that time) Leo Mechelin about the 1809 Diet of Porvoo. Whereas Mechelin thought that Finland and Russia had made a treaty which resulted the two countries to form a so-called "permanent union", Ordin's version was that Finland had simply been merged to the motherland.

References
 Heikkonen, Ojakoski, Väisänen, "Muutosten maailma 4: Suomen historian käännekohtia" (WSOY, 2003), . Pages 59 and 202.

1892 deaths
Saint Petersburg State University alumni
1835 births
19th-century historians from the Russian Empire